The 1916 Summer Olympics, officially known as the Games of the VI Olympiad, were scheduled to be held in Berlin, German Empire, but were eventually cancelled for the first time in its 20-year history due to the outbreak of World War I. Berlin was selected as the host city during the 14th IOC Session in Stockholm on 4 July 1912, defeating bids from Alexandria, Amsterdam, Brussels, Budapest and Cleveland. After the 1916 Games were cancelled, Berlin would eventually host the 1936 Summer Olympics, twenty years later.

History
Work on the stadium, the Deutsches Stadion ("German Stadium"), began in 1912 at what was the Grunewald Race Course. It was planned to seat more than 18,000 spectators. On 8 June 1913, the stadium was dedicated with the release of 10,000 pigeons. 60,000 people were in attendance.

At the outbreak of World War I in 1914, organization continued as it was not expected that the war would continue for several years. Eventually, though, the Games were cancelled.

A winter sports week with speed skating, figure skating, ice hockey and Nordic skiing was planned; the concept of this week eventually gave rise to the first Winter Olympic Games. The central venue was to have been the Deutsches Stadion.

If the games had been played, Finland would not have been allowed to take part by Russia, which revoked the autonomy of Finnish sport in 1914.

Berlin returned to Olympic bidding in 1931, when it beat Barcelona, Spain, for the right to host the 1936 Summer Olympics, the last Olympics before the outbreak of World War II.

See also

References

 
Cancelled events in Germany
Cancelled Olympic Games
Events cancelled due to World War I
1916 in multi-sport events
Summer Olympics by year